Cantonale elections to renew canton general councillors were held in France on 14 and 21 March 1982. The left, in power since 1981, lost 8 and 98 seats to the right, which controlled 59 presidencies out of 95. The Socialists only lost 10 seats, but the Communists lost 45.

Electoral system

The cantonales elections use the same system as the regional or legislative elections. There is a 10% threshold (10% of registered voters) needed to proceed to the second round.

National results

Runoff results missing

Sources

Alain Lancelot, Les élections sous la Ve République, PUF, Paris, 1988

1982
1982 elections in France